Ekka Saka is a Tulu language film, directed by K. Sooraj Shetty and produced by Lion Kishore D. Shetty for Lukumi Cine Creations. It stars Hitesh Naik and Sonal Monteiro. The film was released on 1 May 2015.

Plot
Prashant (Naik), who has been looking after his father's money lending business, falls in love at first sight with Divya (Sonal Monteiro) on the college campus. He asks Divya to marry him. A few days after they meet, she asks him to convince her parents, who oppose the marriage. The couple asks Gopal (Naveen D Padil) for help to get married. But unforeseen events happen.

Cast

Hitesh Naik as Prashanth
Sonal Monteiro as Divya
Aseer Sheik
Naveen D Padil as Gopal
Bhojaraj Vamanjoor
Tennis Krishna
Aravind Bolar as Gunanath
Achyuth Kumar 
Padmaja Rao
Umanath Kotian 
Sudha Belawadi
Sathish Bandale 
Shobhraj Pavoor
Chaitra Shetty as Shilpa
Ravi Surathkal
Sundar Rai Mandara
Chandrahas Kadri
Sandeep Shetty
Prasanna Shetty
Shobha Rai
Raghavendra Rai
Pradeep Alva

Soundtrack
The soundtrack of the film was composed by Ravi Basrur, the composer for the film Ugramm.

Production
Production for the film started on 1 December 2014 when its muhurat shot took place. The film was released on 1 May 2015 in 11 theatres across Karnataka.

References

External links
 

Tulu cinema
Tulu-language films